Sabnam Faria is a Bangladeshi film and drama actress and model, who appears in Bengali drama.

Personal life
Faria was born in Dhaka on 6 January, 1990. She graduated with a degree in English from Eastern University. Her ancestral residence was in Mandartoli(Near Nouri Ahmmadia High School) village in North upazila of Matlab, Chandpur. Her father is a doctor and mother is a housewife. Faria was married to Harunur Rashid Apu on 21 February 2019.The couple separated in  27th November 2020. She have completed her SSC from Barura H.N.A.P. High School and HSC from Chittagong cantonment public college. Afterwards she also earned Masters degree from Independent University Bangladesh on media & communication, major Journalism department.

Career
Faria started her career with television advertisement Pran Chanachur. In 2013, she made her acting debut in the Bengali drama All Time Dourer Upor.

Award
Meril prothom alo award (best newcomer in movie ) 
Babisas award ( best actress in supporting role for debi ) 
Bachosas award ( best actress in supporting role for debi )
CJFB award ( best actress in supporting role for debi )

Filmography

Selected dramas

Web series

References

External links
 
 Sabnam Faria on Facebook
  Sabnam Faria on Instagram

Living people
People from Chandpur District
Bangladeshi actresses
Bangladeshi female models
21st-century Bangladeshi actresses
Bangladeshi television actresses
Place of birth missing (living people)
Year of birth missing (living people)
Best Supporting Actress Bachsas Award winners
Chittagong Cantonment Public College alumni